Xixiposaurus (meaning "Xixipo lizard") is a genus of "prosauropod" dinosaur which existed in what is now Lower Lufeng Formation, China during the lower Jurassic period.  It was first named by Sekiya Toru in 2010 and the type species is X. suni.

Etymology 
The generic name, Xixiposaurus, refers to the village of Xixipo in Lufeng County, Yunnan, China, where the holotype, a partial skeleton with skull named ZLJ01018, was discovered. The specific name, suni, refers to Professor Sun Ge of Jilin University.

Classification 
Sekiya (2010)'s phylogenetic analysis places Xixiposaurus as a derived member of a monophyletic Prosauropoda, a hypothesis that is currently unaccepted. It is placed as the sister taxon to Mussaurus in a family Plateosauridae, which also included Riojasaurus, Coloradisaurus, and "Gyposaurus" sinensis.

References

Early Jurassic dinosaurs of Asia
Sauropodomorphs
Fossil taxa described in 2010
Paleontology in Yunnan